The Coupe de France's results of the 2005–06 season. Six thousand three hundred and ninety-four clubs participated in the cup and the final was played on 29 April 2006 between PSG and Olympique de Marseille. As winners, PSG qualified for the first round of the 2006–07 UEFA Cup.

Round of 64

 *  - after extra-time
 **  - penalty shootouts
 ***  - Longuenesse qualified)

Round of 32

Round of 16

 *  - after extra-time

Quarter-finals

 *  - after extra-time

Semi-finals

Final

Top scorers

References

French federation

France
2005–06 domestic association football cups
2005-06